Verónica Velasco Rodríguez (born 23 January 1972) is a Mexican politician affiliated with the Ecologist Green Party of Mexico. As of 2014 she served as Senator of the LVIII and LIX Legislatures of the Mexican Congress representing Baja California Sur and as Deputy of the LVII and LX Legislatures.

References

1972 births
Living people
Women members of the Senate of the Republic (Mexico)
Members of the Senate of the Republic (Mexico)
Members of the Chamber of Deputies (Mexico)
Ecologist Green Party of Mexico politicians
20th-century Mexican politicians
20th-century Mexican women politicians
21st-century Mexican politicians
21st-century Mexican women politicians
Women members of the Chamber of Deputies (Mexico)
Universidad Iberoamericana alumni
Politicians from Tamaulipas
People from Tampico, Tamaulipas